Governor Bourke may refer to:

Martin Bourke (born 1947), Governor of the Turks and Caicos Islands from 1993 to 1996
Sir Richard Bourke (1777–1855), 8th Governor of New South Wales
Richard Southwell Bourke, 6th Earl of Mayo (1822–1872)